Scutus antipodes, also known as the elephant snail is a large species of marine gastropod mollusc in the family Fissurellidae, the keyhole limpets and slit limpets. S. antipodes is endemic to the waters off eastern Australia and Tasmania.

References

External links
 Elephant snail

Fissurellidae
Gastropods described in 1817